Erlenbach bei Kandel is a municipality in the district of Germersheim, in Rhineland-Palatinate, Germany.

References

Municipalities in Rhineland-Palatinate
Germersheim (district)